Robert Reid-Pharr is an American literary and cultural critic and professor.

Early life and education
A native North Carolinian, Reid-Pharr holds a B.A. in political science from the University of North Carolina at Chapel Hill, and both an M.A. in African American studies and a Ph.D. in American studies from Yale University.

Career
In 2016 he was named a fellow of the John Simon Guggenheim Foundation and visiting professor of gender and sexuality at Harvard University. In 2018, Reid-Pharr became Harvard's first professor of studies of women, gender, and sexuality. His essays have appeared in Callaloo, Social Text, African American Review, American Literary History, AfterImage, Radical America, and American Literature. He has been a fellow of the Alexander von Humboldt Foundation, the Bogliasco Foundation, and the National Endowment for the Humanities.  In 2015 he was inducted into the Johns Hopkins Society of Scholars.

Reid-Pharr has taught at the Graduate Center, CUNY, Johns Hopkins University, the University of Chicago, the University of Oregon, the University of Oxford, the American University of Beirut, Swarthmore College, and the College of William and Mary. His collection of essays Black, Gay, Man: Essays won the 2002 Randy Shilts Award for Best Gay Non-fiction given by the Publishing Triangle. His book Once You Go Black: Choice, Desire, and the Black American Intellectual was a finalist for a Lambda Literary Award. He is also the author of Conjugal Union:The Body, the House, and the Black American (Oxford University Press, 1999); and Archives of Flesh: African America, Spain, and Post-Humanist Critique (NYU 2016) for which he received an honorable mention for the 2017 William Sanders Scarborough Prize of the Modern Language Association.

He is considered a "queer public intellectual" who "attempts to write noncompliance with heteronormativity, and affirmation of other ways of being, into existence"

Selected bibliography
Conjugal Union: The Body, the House, and the Black American
Black Gay Man: Essays (with introduction by Samuel R. Delany)
Once You Go Black: Choice, Desire, and the Black American Intellectual
Archives of Flesh: African America, Spain and Post-Humanist Critique

References

External links
 CUNY Graduate Center Faculty homepage 
 Robert Reid-Pharr Harvard homepage

Living people
Queer theorists
Philosophers of sexuality
Gender studies academics
American literary critics
LGBT African Americans
LGBT people from North Carolina
Graduate Center, CUNY faculty
Johns Hopkins University faculty
University of Chicago faculty
University of Oregon faculty
Swarthmore College faculty
University of North Carolina at Chapel Hill alumni
Yale University alumni
African-American academics
American LGBT writers
Queer men
Queer writers
Year of birth missing (living people)